New Mexico is an unincorporated community, in Carroll County, Maryland, United States. It lies at an elevation of 879 feet (268 m). The community is named after the U.S. State of New Mexico.

References
Notes

Sources

Unincorporated communities in Maryland
Unincorporated communities in Carroll County, Maryland